9300 series may refer to:

Japanese train types 

 Hankyu 9300 series electric multiple unit operating for Hankyu Railroad
 Hanshin 9300 series electric multiple unit operating for Hanshin Electric Railway

Electric multiple units of Japan
Disambiguation pages